Pengsiba or Pengshiba was a ruler of ancient Manipur (Antique Kangleipak). In the 4th century AD, during the reign of his era, Manipuri traders reached out on horseback to upper Burma and China. He is one of the nine kings who are associated with the design of a historic flag.

Other books

References 

Kings of Ancient Manipur
Pages with unreviewed translations